Mark C. MacKinnon is a Canadian politician, entrepreneur, and designer of roleplaying games.

MacKinnon is the founder of Guardians of Order (GoO), and has produced work in the anime genre. His initial release, Big Eyes, Small Mouth, led the company to aggressively license anime properties. With the help of David L. Pulver and others, MacKinnon gradually turned the Tri-Stat System into a universal system, including martial arts, superhero, cyberpunk and urban fantasy games. MacKinnon shut down GoO on August 1, 2006, due to mounting financial difficulties, leaving many writers and artists unpaid.

Career
Mark C. MacKinnon decided to create a general anime role-playing system, so that he could run the games he wanted to see, and created Guardians of Order specifically to publish his anime game. MacKinnon got the name "Guardians of Order" from one of his characters from an Amber Diceless Roleplaying game run by Jesse Scoble. Guardians of Order released MacKinnon's anime game, Big Eyes, Small Mouth (1997) at Gen Con 30. Following the success of BESM, MacKinnon decided to try a licensed property and contracted the rights for Sailor Moon in January 1998 and spent most of the year putting together its RPG, The Sailor Moon Role-Playing Game and Resource Book (1998). MacKinnon brought on David L. Pulver in November 1998. MacKinnon developed the Sailor Moon Collectible Card Game, but the game was actually released by Dart Flipcards. By 2000, MacKinnon was ready to grow Guardians of Order, which began with the hiring of John R. Phythyon, Jr. By 2002 MacKinnon had come to the conclusion that Guardians needed d20 sales in order to survive, and thus the company moved into d20; this with Guardians' new super-hero RPG, Silver Age Sentinels (2002), written by MacKinnon, Jeff Mackintosh and Jesse Scoble, with Steve Kenson and developed by Lucien Soulban. Guardians began having financial problems due to the 2003 d20 crash, and on January 3, 2005, MacKinnon announced Guardians' multiple problems and that the company had been downsized to just himself. George R.R. Martin announced the end of Guardians of Order on July 28, 2006, which MacKinnon then publicly acknowledged on August 1. MacKinnon ultimately left the gaming industry and went into real estate sales.

In 2013, MacKinnon founded Dyskami Publishing Company and returned to game publishing with a Kickstarter for the board game Upon a Fable. MacKinnon later published under Dyskami additional original board games and other licensed tabletop games based on the Sailor Moon Crystal Japanese anime series.

In 2014, MacKinnon was elected as Ward 6 Councillor for Guelph City Council for a four-year term. He was re-elected in 2018.

June 2019, MacKinnon announced the return of BESM for a Fourth Edition under Dyskami Publishing Company. MacKinnon served as the primary author for the new edition.

References

Living people
Canadian game designers
Guelph city councillors
Role-playing game designers
Place of birth missing (living people)
Year of birth missing (living people)